The 2011–12 Tulsa Golden Hurricane men's basketball team represented the University of Tulsa during the 2011–12 NCAA Division I men's basketball season. The Golden Hurricane, led by seventh year head coach Doug Wojcik, played their home games at the Reynolds Center and are members of Conference USA. They finished the season 17–14, 10–6 in C-USA to finish in a tie for third place. They lost in the quarterfinals of the C-USA Basketball tournament to Marshall. They did not accept an invitation to a post season tournament. Head coach Doug Wojcik was fired at the end of the season. He compiled a record of 140–92 in seven seasons and is the school’s all-time leader in coaching victories. He will be replaced by Danny Manning.

Roster

Schedule

|-
!colspan=9| Exhibition

|-
!colspan=9| Regular season

|-
!colspan=9| 2012 Conference USA men's basketball tournament

References

Tulsa Golden Hurricane men's basketball seasons
Tulsa
2011 in sports in Oklahoma
2012 in sports in Oklahoma